Walbrook Rowing Club, colloquially sometimes named Teddington Rowing Club, is a rowing club, on the River Thames in England on the Middlesex bank 800 metres above Teddington Lock next to Trowlock Island, Teddington. It is the lowest club on the weir-controlled Thames (i.e. not the Tideway) and is the organising club for Teddington Head of the River Race held in November for all classes of racing shells.

It shares, in its sport, the quite broad Kingston and Ditton Reach which ends 6.4 kilometres upstream at Molesey Lock with Kingston Rowing Club, Tiffin, Tiffin Girls and Kingston Grammar Schools and has clubs in other watersports – principally canoeing, sailing and a skiff club.

History
The rowing club was originally established in Teddington in 1961 for BP employees, hence the club colours of green, yellow and black. In 1993 BP closed its Teddington leisure services site. Walbrook Rowing Club continued independently and acquired the site by pooling resources with the Royal Canoe Club and its associated watersports club, The Skiff Club to become the rowing section of 'Walbrook and Royal Canoe Club (RCC)'. Within weeks Kingston Royals Dragon Boat Racing Club joined the combined organisation.

Membership
Walbook, early in the first decade of the 21st century, became on the transformation of its governing body, the recognised governing body in the sport, an open club to men and women of all backgrounds and members of Walbrook RC also become members of the RCC and have access to all the facilities on the site. Walbrook Rowing Club boat house is in a two-storey building (left of picture) and the Royal Canoe Club meanwhile reconstructed its clubhouse on Trowlock Island. 

The rowing club aims to teach beginners to row and has a junior section for ages 12–18. There are a variety of races available to members of the club, and committed members can be expecting to race every other week or so during regatta season.

Position
Walbrook is the first non-tidal club on the weir-controlled Thames.  The key feature of the non-tidal Thames compared to complex rules along the Tideway is that navigation is always on the right.  In all but exceptional stream the water resembles the middle sections of a few wide rivers in the UK, being long weir-controlled rowing rivers in the UK capable of handing more than three large vessels side by side.

See also
Rowing on the River Thames
The Skiff Club

References

External links
 Walbrook Rowing Club official website
 The Skiff Club official website

Sports clubs established in 1963
Rowing clubs of the River Thames
Sport in the London Borough of Richmond upon Thames